The  ("Council for German Orthography" or "Council for German Spelling"), or , is the main international body regulating Standard High German orthography.

Currently the RdR is composed of 41 members from those states and regions in the German Sprachraum:

 : 18 councillors
 : 9 councillors
 : 9 councillors
  (Belgium): 1 councillor
 : 1 councillor
  (Italy): 1 councillor
 : 1 observer (no voting right)

Despite having German as one of its official languages, Luxembourg, which was not involved in devising the reform of 1996, is not a full member of the council. The government of Luxembourg unilaterally adopted the reform. Despite this, Luxembourg takes part in the annual meetings of German-speaking countries.

See also 

 German orthography

References

External links 
  

Language regulators
German orthography
2004 establishments in Germany
Mannheim
Organizations established in 2004